Bauerntanz zweier Kinder (also known as Italienischer Bauerntanz or Italian Folk dance) is an 1895 German short black-and-white silent documentary film directed by Max Skladanowsky. The film captures two children,  Ploetz and Lorella, performing a dance.

It was one of a series of films produced to be projected by a magic lantern and formed part of the Wintergarten Performances, the first projections of film in Europe to a paying audience. The film titles for the initial program were: Bauerntanz zweier Kinder, Komisches Reck, Serpentinen Tanz, Der Jongleur Paul Petras, Das Boxende Känguruh, Akrobatisches Potpourri, Kamarinskaja, Ringkampf, and Apotheose. Each film lasted approximately six seconds and would be repeated several times.

References

External links 
 

1895 films
1890s German films
Films of the German Empire
German black-and-white films
German short documentary films
German silent short films
1890s short documentary films
Black-and-white documentary films
Films directed by Max Skladanowsky
1890s dance films